Behind the Walls may refer to:
 Behind the Walls, the first special episode of Prison Break
 Derrière les murs, the first French live-action feature to be shot in 3D
 "Behind the Walls", a song on The N.W.A Legacy, Vol. 2
 Behind the Walls (film), a 2008 French film
 "Behind the Walls", a 2018 US film, written and directed by The Kondelik Brothers